The Zhongnan Mountains, sometimes called the Taiyi Mountains or Zhounan Mountains, are a branch of the Qin Mountains located in Shaanxi Province, south of Xi'an, China that extend from Wugong County in the east of the province to Lantian County.  At 2604 meters the range's highest point is the Cui Hua Mountain.  Other notable peaks and places in the Zhongnan mountains include Lou Guan Tai, (where Taoist sage Laozi is said to have dwelt and conveyed the Dao De Jing), as well as Nan Wutai and Guifeng.

The Zhongnan mountains have been a popular dwelling-place for Daoist hermits since at least the Qin Dynasty. Buddhist monks began living in the mountains after Buddhism's introduction into China from India in the early first millennium AD.  The Complete Perfection Sect, one of the largest branches of modern Taoism, was founded in the Zhongnan mountains by Song Dynasty Taoist Wang Chongyang.  Due to the mountains' close proximity to the ancient capital of Chang'an, officials who incurred the imperial court's wrath often fled to these mountains to escape punishment.

The Chinese folklorical deity Zhong Kui is said to have grown up in those same mountains. Other than the name, the context of Zhong Kui being a protection deity related to Taoist belief can be connected with the creation of the complete perfection sect.

See also
Qin Mountains
Wang Wei

References
 Bill Porter, Road To Heaven: Encounters with Chinese Hermits. Counterpoint, 1993.  .
 Edward A. Burger, Amongst White Clouds. Buddhist Hermit Masters of China's Zhongnan Mountains, Festival Media, 2007. Documentary movie.

External links

Zhongnan
Landforms of Shaanxi
History of Shaanxi